Grădinari may refer to several places in Romania:

 Grădinari, Caraş-Severin, a commune in Caraş-Severin County
 Grădinari, Giurgiu, a commune in Giurgiu County
 Grădinari, Olt, a commune in Olt County
 Grădinari, a village in Drăgăneşti Commune, Bihor County
 Grădinari, a village in Golăiești Commune, Iaşi County

See also
Grădiștea (disambiguation)